Lubanah Mshaweh (born December 1955) is the minister of culture of Syria. She holds a PhD in linguistics  from Paris 8 University.

She was included in the list of sanctioned individuals, during the Syrian Civil War, by the European Union, as she "shares responsibility for the regime's violent repression against the civilian population."

She resumed her role as Minister of Culture in 2020 for the Hussein Arnous government, and then for his second cabinet.

See also
Syrian Ministry of Culture
Cabinet of Syria

References

External links
Syrian Ministry of Culture, official website

1955 births
Living people
Syrian ministers of culture
People from Damascus
Damascus University alumni
University of Paris alumni
Women government ministers of Syria
21st-century Syrian politicians
21st-century Syrian women politicians